RKM or rkm can refer to:

 Ramakrishna Mission, Hindu religious  organization
 Reichskommissariat Moskowien
 RKM, the ISO 639-3 code for the Marka language
 RKM, alias for Rulla Kelly-Mansell, in the Australian hip hop duo MLRN x RKM
 R.K.M & Ken-Y, a Puerto Rican reggaeton duo
 RKM code, for resistor and capacitor values
 Rotary Piston Machine (German Rotationskolbenmaschine)

See also
 ŻKS ROW Rybnik, a Polish motorcycle club whose name was once RKM ROW Rybnik